Glen Constantin (born December 23, 1964) is the current head coach of the Université Laval football team, the Laval Rouge et Or, a position he has held since 2001. He has won ten Vanier Cups with the team, including nine as head coach which is the most by a single head coach in U Sports football history. He was named coach of the year in 2005 and in 2010. As head coach, Constantin has an all-time record of 185-30 (134–21 in regular season; 52–11 in playoffs), with 14 Quebec championships as of 2019.

In 2010, the Rouge et Or won the Vanier Cup against the Calgary Dinos, 29–2, after thirteen straight victories, which was a first in CIS football history. In 2014, his football team established a new CIS record with 22 straight wins.

Head coaching record

A. Laval originally finished the 2001 season with a 5–3 record, first place finish, and a Dunsmore Cup victory. However, it was determined that the team had used an ineligible player throughout the entire season and therefore vacated all regular season and post-season wins well after the 2001 season had concluded.

References

External links 
 Le Rouge et Or official website (in French)

1964 births
Living people
Sportspeople from Quebec City
Players of Canadian football from Quebec
Ottawa Gee-Gees football players
Bishop's Gaiters football coaches
Houston Cougars football coaches
Laval Rouge et Or football coaches